Gautam Bhattacharya started his career as a sports journalist. Subsequently, he expanded his field of work to become a published author, a cricket commentator on Star Sports, host of online shows, and anchor of national and international shows. He was the associate editor of Ananda Bazar Patrika in India. He handled both sports and entertainment for the publication. He joined Ananda Bazar Patrika in January 1983 as a trainee journalist with The Telegraph (Kolkata). From February 2017 to March 2022, Bhattacharya was the joint editor of the Bengali-language daily Sangbad Pratidin. As of April 2022, Bhattacharya is the editor of Zee 24 Ghanta, one of eastern India's most renowned TV channels.

Early life
Gautam Bhattacharya was born in Kolkata and brought up in Chennai. His father was a senior accounts officer with the central government who was born in Bangladesh Faridpur District to a School Master.

Education
Gautam Bhattacharya completed his schooling at the Ballygunge Government High School. He later graduated from St. Xavier's College, Kolkata. Seven days before the Indian Institute of Social Welfare and Business Management entrance examination in January 1983, he gave an interview to the editor of The Telegraph (Kolkata), M J Akbar. He was asked to join The Telegraph the same day.

Books
He has written books like Sach (a biography of Sachin Tendulkar).

He is the author of the book in Bengali Jaya He.

He is the author of the book in Bengali WIKI

He is the author of the book in Bengali BARPUJO

Awards and recognition
His efforts in journalism and skill of writing has fetched him many awards which include:

 Sports Editor of the year-2006 August, by Bengal Young Sports Journalists' Association
 Story of the year-2006 October, by Sports Journalists' Federation of India
 Excellence in Sports Journalism- 2008 September, by Shyam Steel Industries
 Sports Editor of the year- 2008 December, by Bengal Young Sports Journalists' Association.
 Rose Valley Award.
 KKN Journalism Award
 Co-Author of book on crilllSourav Ganguly (due in stands mid-2017)
 Author of Pankaj, the only authorized biography of legendary Indian Cricketer Pankaj Roy.
 Only Asian journalist to have exclusive interviews with the "Big Three" - Pelé, Don Bradman and Diego Maradona

See also
Ravi Chaturvedi
Mayanti Langer

References

External links
 

Indian sports journalists
Living people
University of Calcutta alumni
Indian male journalists
Year of birth missing (living people)
 Journalists from West Bengal